Vanakkam Da Mappilei also spelt as Vanakkam Da Mappillai is a 2021 Indian Tamil-language romantic comedy film written and directed by M. Rajesh. The film stars G. V. Prakash Kumar, Amritha Aiyer and Anandaraj. It was streamed via Sun NXT on 16 April 2021 and received negative reviews from critics.

Plot 
Aravind and Swaminathan are childhood friends and they vow to get married on the same stage. Aravind is employed in a ship while Swami owns a travel agency. Swami’s wedding is arranged with his cousin but Aravind requests Swami to postpone the wedding for 6 months, so that Aravind could also find a suitable bride and as per plan both the couples could marry on the same stage. However, none of the girls seem to be interested in marrying Aravind due to his job nature as he has to be in ship for 6 months in a year. One day, Aravind meets Thulasi and falls in love with her. After a few initial hesitations, Thulasi also reciprocates.

Ramachandran is a single parent who raised Thulasi following his wife’s early demise. Thulasi is also very fond her father and she wants him to come with her after wedding for which he does not agree. Thulasi introduces Aravind to Ramachandran and both share a good rapport. However, Ramachandran comes up with a condition to Aravind for getting Thulasi married to him. Ramachandran wants Aravind to find a suitable bride for him first, so that he can spend rest of his life happily. Now, Aravind and Swami start searching for a bride. They decide to get their yoga master Maya married to Ramachandran which does not work out.

Aravind sends Ramachandran to a spiritual centre, where he meets a foreigner and falls in love and eventually they both get married. Aravind feels happy that his route is clear, however, Thulasi does not agree to Aravind’s plan of conducting their wedding along with Swami’s on the same stage. This angers Aravind and they both break-up. Swami suggests Aravind to marry his another cousin for which he agrees. Aravind and Swami visit Swami’s uncle’s house with the marriage proposal, however they are shocked to see that both Swami’s cousins are already married to some other grooms. Heartbroken Swami decides to become a saint and starts a journey towards Varanasi.

But Aravind gets patched up with Thulasi and their pre-wedding reception is arranged for which Swami goes. There he finds Preeti who was his ex-lover during college days. Swami patches up again with Preeti and their wedding is arranged. As per plan, Aravind and Swami’s wedding happen on the same stage.

Cast 

 G. V. Prakash Kumar as Aravind
 Amritha Aiyer as Thulasi
 Daniel Annie Pope as Swaminathan, Aravind's friend
 Anandaraj as Ramachandran (Rams / Adyar "Undertaker"), Thulasi's father
 M. S. Bhaskar as Councillor Puniyakotti
 Jayaprakash as Natraj, Aravind's father
 Pragathi as Shanthi, Aravind's mother
 Reshma Pasupuleti as Maya
 Shiv Aditya as Aakash
 R. S. Shivaji as Swaminathan's grandfather
 Soundarya Bala Nandakumar as Preeti
 Deepa Balu as Divya, Thulasi's friend
 Gowthami Vembunathan as Kannamma
 Guru Ramesh as Madhushudhan
 A. Revathy as Swaminathan's grandmother's 
 Poorni as Receptionist
 Yogi Babu as himself (Guest appearance)

Production 
The film marked the second collaboration between director M. Rajesh and G. V. Prakash Kumar after Kadavul Irukaan Kumaru (2016). The film was titled as Vanakkam Da Mappillai based on the popular TikTok meme created by a netizen which became viral during the lockdown in Tamil Nadu. Filming wrapped in February 2021.

Soundtrack 
The soundtrack was composed by G. V. Prakash Kumar, collaborating with Rajesh for the second time after Kadavul Irukaan Kumaru (2016). The first single of the film titled Tata Bye Bye was sung by actor Dhanush, and the lyrics were penned by Gaana Vinoth.

Release 
It was originally planned that the film would be having its direct-to-television premiere on Sun TV on 14 April 2021, Puthandu (Tamil New Year). However, the filmmakers later pushed the release date to 1 May 2021, May Day. Later this plan was dropped; instead the film directly released via Sun NXT on 16 April 2021. The film had its television premiere on 12 May 2021 on the eve of Ramzan.

Reception 
Ashutosh Mohan of Film Companion wrote, "Imagine all the good fun Rajesh can whip up, if only he was not so obsessed with soup boys and rich girls. But if you find it amusing that the hero and his friend are called Aravind and Swami, then Vannakkamda Mappilei is your fix." Bhuvanesh Chandar of Cinema Express wrote, "With too many issues and no takeaways, Vanakkam Da Mappilei has nothing worth rooting for".

References

External links 
 

2020s Tamil-language films
2021 direct-to-video films
2021 films
2021 romantic comedy films
Films directed by M. Rajesh
Films scored by G. V. Prakash Kumar
Indian direct-to-video films
Indian romantic comedy films